Diestramima is a genus of camel crickets in the subfamily Aemodogryllinae and tribe Diestramimini.  Species can be found in: India, southern China and Indo-China.

Note: this genus should not be confused with the similarly-named Diestrammena which belongs to the tribe Aemodogryllini.

Species
The Orthoptera Species File lists:
 Diestramima acutiapicis Zhu & Shi, 2018
 Diestramima austrosinensis Gorochov, 1998
 Diestramima beybienkoi Qin, Wang, Liu & Li, 2016
 Diestramima bina Zhu & Shi, 2018
 Diestramima bispinosa Gorochov & Storozhenko, 2015
 Diestramima brevis Qin, Wang, Liu & Li, 2016
 Diestramima champasak Gorochov & Storozhenko, 2015
 Diestramima conica Qin, Wang, Liu & Li, 2016
 Diestramima cryptopygia (Chopard, 1918)
 Diestramima curvicaudata Qin, Wang, Liu & Li, 2016
 Diestramima cycla Zhu & Shi, 2018
 Diestramima distincta Gorochov, 2010
 Diestramima emeiensis Qin, Wang, Liu & Li, 2016
 Diestramima eurya Zhu & Shi, 2018
 Diestramima excavata Qin, Wang, Liu & Li, 2016
 Diestramima guangxiensis Qin, Wang, Liu & Li, 2016
 Diestramima hainanensis Gorochov & Storozhenko, 2015
 Diestramima hamata Gorochov & Storozhenko, 2015
 Diestramima himalayana (Griffini, 1914)
 Diestramima intermedia Liu & Zhang, 2001
 Diestramima major Gorochov, 1998
 Diestramima minor Gorochov, 1998
 Diestramima palpata (Rehn, 1906) - type species
 Diestramima parabispinosa Qin, Wang, Liu & Li, 2016
 Diestramima propria Gorochov & Storozhenko, 2015
 Diestramima subrectis Qin, Wang, Liu & Li, 2016
 Diestramima subtilis Zhu & Shi, 2018
 Diestramima tibetensis Qin, Wang, Liu & Li, 2016
 Diestramima triangulata Qin, Wang, Liu & Li, 2016
 Diestramima truncata Zhu & Shi, 2018
 Diestramima tsongkhapa (Würmli, 1973)
 Diestramima vietnamensis Gorochov, 1998
 Diestramima yunnanensis Gorochov & Storozhenko, 2015

References 

Ensifera genera
Rhaphidophoridae
Invertebrates of Southeast Asia